Peter Nocke (born 25 October 1955 in Langenberg, North Rhine-Westphalia) is a retired freestyle swimmer, who represented West Germany at the 1976 Summer Olympics in Montreal, Quebec, Canada. There he won the bronze medal in the men's 100 m freestyle. Nocke won a total number of nine European titles during the 1970s.

References

1955 births
Living people
People from Velbert
Sportspeople from Düsseldorf (region)
German male swimmers
Swimmers at the 1976 Summer Olympics
Olympic swimmers of West Germany
Olympic bronze medalists in swimming
German male freestyle swimmers
World Aquatics Championships medalists in swimming
European Aquatics Championships medalists in swimming
Medalists at the 1976 Summer Olympics
Olympic bronze medalists for West Germany
20th-century German people
21st-century German people